The wedge-snouted blind snake (Afrotyphlops cuneirostris), also known as the wedgenose blind snake,  is a species of snake in the Typhlopidae family.

References

cuneirostris
Reptiles described in 1879
Taxa named by Wilhelm Peters